This is a list of flag bearers who have represented Yemen at the Olympics.

Flag bearers carry the national flag of their country at the opening ceremony of the Olympic Games.

See also
Yemen at the Olympics

References

Yemen at the Olympics
Yemen
Olympic flagbearers